Rufus Arthur Johnson (born July 5, 1976), better known by his stage name Bizarre, is an American rapper, best known for his work with the Detroit-based hip hop group D12.

Early life
Bizarre was born Rufus Arthur Johnson on July 5, 1976 in Detroit, Michigan. Bizarre grew up living with his single mother. He started rapping when he was in fifth grade. His teacher thought he was talking to himself, and began calling him 'Bizarre'. In 1995, he joined the rap group D12 with neighborhood friends DeShaun "Proof" Holton, Karnail "Bugz" Pitts, Carlos "Fuzz Scoota" Rabb, Willie "Eye Kyu" Drake, and Von "Kuniva" Carlisle. He also met Marshall "Eminem" Mathers through Proof. Bizarre used to attend a club on Friday nights called 'The Shelter' in Saint Andrew's Hall, where rap battles were held.

Career

1990s and 2000s
He was then featured on D12's first EP in 1997 titled The Underground EP. On the EP Bizarre recorded songs with D12 members Proof, Eye Kyu,  Bugz, Eminem, Kuniva, & Mr Porter,   before going on to release his debut solo EP titled Attack of the Weirdos in 1997. In 2001, D12 released their debut album, Devil's Night. In 2004, he was a part of the second studio album of D12 titled D12 World. Bizarre then released his first official studio album in 2005 titled Hannicap Circus through his own label Redhead Records, which received mixed reviews. He also appeared on the 2006 Shady Records compilation album Eminem Presents: The Re-Up, on the track "Murder" along with D12 member, Kuniva. Following the death of rapper Proof in April 2006, he and the rest of D12 became inactive for some time.

In 2007, Bizarre released his second studio album called Blue Cheese & Coney Island. In 2008, Bizarre and D12 recorded their first official mixtape titled Return of the Dozen. A sequel titled Return of the Dozen Vol. 2 followed in 2011.

2010-present
In 2010, Bizarre released his third studio album on Average Joes Entertainment, titled Friday Night at St. Andrews. The album is more reality-based on actual situations throughout Bizarre's early life and career, thus the album is more conscious than his previous releases. The album features guest appearances from Seven the General, Royce da 5'9", Tech N9ne, Yelawolf, Kuniva, and more.

The first single released was "Believer" with Tech N9ne & Nate Walker. The second official single for the album was "Rap's Finest" featuring Kuniva, Seven the General, Royce da 5'9" & Redman. However, for unexplained reasons, Redman would not appear on the album version of the single or the video.

Bizarre, along with King Gordy, formed a hip hop duo called The Davidians. The Davidians were featured on Esham's mixtape, The Butcher Shop. The duo is currently signed to Majik Ninja Entertainment under the name Last American Rock Stars. Bizarre was featured in Snowgoons's music video with Swifty McVay, King Gordy, Sean Strange and Meth Mouth.

In 2010, Bizarre was featured on the single "Be a Legend" with Russian hip-hop group Red Family MC'z. In 2011, Bizarre was featured on the track "Shock Em" with underground rap group Bankrupt Records for the album Double Vision. In 2012, Bizarre released his fourth mixtape, titled This Guy's a Weirdo, which includes a song titled "Justin Bieber" featuring King Gordy that was released along with a music video via Reel Wolf. In the song, Bizarre fantasizes about raping and murdering Canadian singer Justin Bieber.

In 2014, he released a song called "Pray for Me" for his upcoming album. His Lace Blunts 2 mixtape was released in March 2014, with nineteen tracks featuring guest artists such as Fuzz Scoota of their group D12, Rittz, Young Zee, King Gordy, and Big T.

Bizarre was featured on an international collaboration track called "Fuck the DJ" by UK rapper Blacklisted MC also featuring Coolio, Adil Omar (from Pakistan) and Uzimon (from Bermuda) the song was premiered on music website Noisey from Vice magazine in October 2014.

Later in the year he wrote a verse alongside Detroit artists Mastamind and Jeremiah Ferguson for their song "Whats Right".

In 2014, he was featured on the single "Open Heart Surgery" by rapper Lazarus. It was released under All Def Digital and it won the award for "Song of the Year" at the 12th Underground Music Awards in New York City.

He has also made an appearance on a track titled "In Yo Behind" by Struggle Da Preacher which was released on Struggle's album Ups'n'Downs on June 30, 2014. In July 2015 they shot a video for it in Moscow, Russia. Mike ADHD "Frag Out" featuring Young Dirty Bastard, Baby Eazy E and Bizarre.

In August 2017, The Keepaz of the Krypt (One Man Kru & Kapital Z) single "Diaries of the Whack Emcees" feat. Bizarre of D12 was released on all digital media outlets as well as One Man Kru's bandcamp page. The song garnered over 1 million plays on SoundCloud in its first week of release. The track was released just two weeks before it was announced that Bizarre had signed to Majik Ninja Entertainment.

In May 2018, Bizarre released music video "Cocaine In Miami" directed by Abeni Nazeer. He was also a feature guest on the Song Sadistentreff 2 by German rapper Crystal f, along with Timi Hendrix and King Gordy.

On July 9, 2018, Bizarre announced that he was reviving Redhead Records with Danny Mellz being his first act other than himself

In September 2018, Bizarre featured in the single "Weirdo (feat. Bizarre)" by No Concept on Drumsound and Bassline Smith's label, Technique Recordings.

Also in September 2018, Bizarre made headlines again with Eminem by releasing his own diss track aimed towards Machine Gun Kelly, Jay Electronica and Joe Budden during the MGK and Joe Budden vs. Eminem beef of 2018. Bizarre's diss track titled "Love Tap" was released as a single everywhere on September 18, 2018.

Bizarre also signed a deal for his podcast “The Bizarre World Podcast” with The Digital Soapbox Network/CBS/Entercom

On October 10, 2019, Bizarre released his second Extended Play Rufus. The day after the  release of his second extended play, he announced the release of a duo mixtape “Leatherface Mixtape” with Hopsin on October 31, 2019.

On May 31, 2020, Bizarre appeared on an album “Tabu“ of a Czech rapper named Schyzo on the song “Lubrikant“.

Bizarre is featured on "Fat Man Swag" by Pacific Northwest rapper Jawbo, released on July 22, 2021.

Bizarre is featured on "Limitless" by Canadian rapper Brax, from album "Leave it to Cleaver"  released in late 2021.

On October 31, 2021, Bizarre shared his fifth album "Dumpster Juice" with features from Kidd Kidd, Merkules, and Giggs, among others.

Discography

 Studio albums
Hannicap Circus (2005)
Blue Cheese & Coney Island (2007)
Friday Night at St. Andrews (2010)
Rufus (2019)
Dumpster Juice (2021)
Peter (2022)
He Got a Gun (2022)
18159 Stout (2023)

 Extended plays
Attack of the Weirdos (1998)

 Collaborative albums

Devil's Night (with D12) (2001)
D12 World (with D12) (2004)
Taking Lives (with Fury as Something Awful) (2010)
Last American Rock Stars (with King Gordy as L.A.R.S.) (2018)
All in My Head (with Wack Rac) (2020)

 Mixtapes
Hate Music (2008)
Liquor, Weed & Food Stamps (2008)
This Guy's a Weirdo (2012)
Lace Blunts (2013)
Lace Blunts 2 (2014)
Dab Life (2015)
Tweek Sity (2015)
Tweek Sity 2  (2017)
Foul World (with King Gordy as L.A.R.S.) (2017)
Pill God (2018)
The Leatherface Mixtape (2019)

 Collaboration singles
Where da Hoes at? (with King Killumbia & Project Pat) (2019)
All Night (with King Killumbia & MET G) (2019)
Detroit 2 Memphis (with Kingpin Skinny Pimp & Mexiveli) (2019)

References

Further reading
Bizarre interview by Pete Lewis, 'Blues & Soul' September 2010.

1976 births
African-American male rappers
Average Joes Entertainment artists
Horrorcore artists
Living people
Midwest hip hop musicians
Rappers from Detroit
Shady Records artists
D12 members
20th-century American rappers
21st-century American rappers
20th-century American male musicians
21st-century American male musicians
20th-century African-American musicians
21st-century African-American musicians
Underground rappers
American comedy musicians